Transmitter Szczecin/Kołowo is a transmission facility for FM and TV situated at Szczecin/Kołowo in Poland.

The antenna tower is a 267 metre tall guyed mast. It was built in 1963. It has two antenna masts, which are 267 and 70 metres tall which are visible several kilometres away and hence a well-known local landmark. In the 1930s, an observation tower was put up. In 1963 a 228-metre  mast for TV broadcasting was erected. It was raised a further 25 metres to carry antennas for directional radio services. In 1985 a new mast with a height of 267 m was built. The old mast was shortened in 1989 to 61 metres. (source: Polish text)

Transmitted programmes

Digital television MPEG-4

FM radio

See also
 List of masts

Towers in Poland
Gryfino County
Buildings and structures in West Pomeranian Voivodeship
Towers completed in 1963
1963 establishments in Poland